"If Only" is an alternative rock song performed by Scottish singer KT Tunstall. The song was written by Tunstall and Jimmy Hogarth for Tunstall's second album Drastic Fantastic (2007). It was released as the album's third single in the United Kingdom on 3 March 2008. "If Only" reached No. 45 on the UK Singles Chart.

History
"If Only" first appeared as a track on Tunstall's second unreleased demo album, Toons March '03. The demo version of "If Only" is markedly different from the version found on Drastic Fantastic, with a mellower sound and slightly slower tempo and Tunstall having a slightly higher tone to her voice. For a period of time, prior to the release of Eye to the Telescope, the demo versions of "If Only" and "Other Side of the World" were available for download free of charge on Tunstall's website.  In 2018 it was used in the Hallmark Channel movie "Winter's Dream" starring Dean Cain.

"If Only" is reportedly one of KT Tunstall's favourite songs on Drastic Fantastic.

Music video 
The music video for "If Only" was directed by James Caddick and filmed at the Olympic Ski Jumping Hill (Lysgårdsbakken) in Lillehammer, Norway. The video features Tunstall as a ski jumper who fails to complete an important jump. The video concludes with an injured Tunstall bleeding from the nose being helped up, smiling to the camera.

Critical reception 
"If Only" has received mixed reviews from music critics. Reviewers for Channel 4 praised the song for its "chirpy chorus and beaming harmonies" and gave it eight stars out of ten. Christopher Hammer of AllGigs.co.uk gave it three stars out of five, calling it an "[almost] perfect song for a lazy Sunday afternoon drive". Sarah Walters of the Manchester Evening News was less impressed, viewing the song's "chart-ready pop" sound and "bah-bah-bah backing vocals" as a step backwards from her earlier hits such as "Black Horse and the Cherry Tree", and gave it two stars out of five. It was chosen as an album highlight by Allmusic editor Stephen Thomas Erlewine.

Formats and track listings
These are the formats and track listings of single releases of "If Only".

UK CD single
(Released )
"If Only"
"Walk Like an Egyptian" (Live in Liverpool)

7" vinyl single
(Released 3 March 2008)
"If Only"
"The Prayer" (Radio 1 Live Lounge)

Digital download
(Released )
"If Only"
"Walk Like an Egyptian" (Live in Liverpool)

Promo CD
"If Only" (Radio Edit) 3:30
"If Only" 3:46
"If Only" (Instrumental) 3:46

Charts

Notes

2008 singles
KT Tunstall songs
Songs written by KT Tunstall
Songs written by Jimmy Hogarth
2007 songs
Virgin Records singles